The Boeuf Wildlife Management Area is s of bottomland hardwoods, cypress-tupelo swamp (cypress dome), and other wetland habitats in northeast Louisiana. It is owned by the Louisiana Department of Wildlife and Fisheries. Boeuf Wildlife Management Area is located in Caldwell and Catahoula Parishes, near the city of Columbia, Louisiana.

The forest overstory is a relatively closed stand of mixed bottomland hardwoods. On higher elevations the predominant tree species are willow oak, water oak, Nuttall’s oak, rock elm, sweetgum, and persimmon.

Important species in the lower elevations are overcup oak, bitter pecan, and honey locust, with cypress and tupelo gum being found in sloughs and old lakes. Understory species commonly found on Boeuf WMA include deciduous holly, hawthorn, swamp privet, rattan, greenbriar and grape. Boeuf has a greentree reservoir and several moist soil impoundments available for waterfowl and other wetland species.

Birding Opportunities 

Boeuf WMA is under consideration for the America's Wetland Foundation Red River Birding Trail and Mississippi River Birding Trail.

See also
List of Louisiana Wildlife Management Areas

References 

Wildlife management areas of the United States
Wildlife management areas of Louisiana
Protected areas of Louisiana
Protected areas of Caldwell Parish, Louisiana
Protected areas of Catahoula Parish, Louisiana